Liat Ben-Moshe is a disability scholar and assistant professor of criminology, Law, and Justice at the University of Illinois at Chicago. Ben-Moshe holds a PhD in sociology from Syracuse University with concentrations in Women and Gender Studies and Disability Studies. Ben-Moshe's work “has brought an intersectional disability studies approach to the phenomenon of mass incarceration and decarceration in the US”. Ben-Moshe's major works include Building Pedagogical Curb Cuts: Incorporating Disability into the University Classroom and Curriculum (2005), Disability Incarcerated: Imprisonment and Disability in the United States and Canada (2014), and Decarcerating Disability: Deinstitutionalization and Prison Abolition (2020). Ben-Moshe is best known for her theories of dis-epistemology, genealogy of deinstitutionalization, and race-ability.

Life and career 
Ben-Moshe completed a PhD in sociology from Syracuse University in 2011 with concentrations in Women and Gender Studies and Disability Studies. In 2017, she received the American Association of University Women research fellowship. Presently, Ben-Moshe works as the Acting Graduate Director of Criminology, Law, and Justice at the University of Illinois at Chicago. At University of Illinois, Ben-Moshe focuses on “Incarceration and decarceration/ Critical prison studies/Prison abolition; Disability Studies/Mad Studies; Social theory (Feminist, Queer, Critical Race); Activism and resistance; Inclusive pedagogy”. Ben-Moshe is most well known for her works on carceral ableism, specifically her books Disability Incarcerated (2014) and Decarcerating Disability (2020). Her work seeks to see disability, “as a nuanced identity from which to understand how to live differently including re-evaluating criminal justice responses to harm”.

Major works

Building Pedagogical Curb Cuts 
Building Pedagogical Curb Cuts: Incorporating Disability into the University Classroom and Curriculum, edited by Liat Ben-Moshe, Rebecca C. Cory, Mia Feldbaum, and Ken Sagendorf, was published in 2005 through the graduate school of Syracuse University. The book was a “collaborative and interdisciplinary effort to examine how the university can better include the perspectives of scholars and students who have disabilities in the classroom” “through the combined efforts of the Beyond Compliance Coordinating Committee (BCCC) and the Graduate School, both of Syracuse University”. Building Pedagogical Curb Cuts expands beyond strategies for compliance in the ADA and looks towards disability-inclusive pedagogy in university classrooms.

Disability Incarcerated 
Disability Incarcerated: Imprisonment and Disability in the United States and Canada was published in 2014 by PALGRAVE MACMILLAN. The book was edited by Liat Ben-Moshe, Chris Chapman, and Allison C. Carey, with a foreword by activist and philosopher Angela Davis. Disability Incarcerated takes an interdisciplinary approach to connect the study of incarceration to disability studies while “expanding theoretical boundaries of each discipline”. Jennifer A. Janechek, of the University of Iowa, writes for Disability Studies Quarterly that “Disability Incarcerated embraces "intersectionality" to expose how "disability, situated alongside other key lines of stratification … is central to understanding the complex, varied, and interlocking ways in which incarceration occurs and is made out to be normal, natural, politically necessary, and beneficial”.

Decarcerating disability 
Decarcerating Disability: Deinstitutionalization and Prison Abolition (2020) was published by University of Minnesota Press in 2020. In the book Ben-Moshe uses Michel Foucault's tactic to expand the concept of abolition using a genealogy of deinstitutionalization in the twentieth century. She explains how “abolition is not an unattainable goal but rather a reality. Ben-Moshe coins this new version of abolition as dis-epistemology. She examines the prison industrial complex through discussions on how deinstitutionalization is wrongly blamed for the influx of  incarceration, why race and disability are important to examine together (a theory she coins “raceability”), and the limits of inclusions discourses for disability rights.

Key theories

Disepistemology 
Disepistemology is an abolition theory created by Ben-Moshe that sees abolition as not a goal but a radical epistemological process. In her book, Decarcerating Disability, Ben-Moshe explains how, “that abolition is a radical epistemology of knowing and unknowing. Therefore the second meaning in which abolition operates as an epistemology is as giving way to other ways of knowing. I term this dis- epistemology, letting go of attachment to certain ways of knowing”.

Genealogy of Deinstitutionalization 
Ben-Moshe utilizes Michel Foucault's conception of genealogy to analyze the history of deinstitutionalization and the power structures that influenced it. Deinstitutionalization was a 20th-century movement to abolish psychiatric hospitals. In Decarcerating Disability (2020), Ben-Moshe conducts a “genealogical excavation of abolition within deinstitutionalization discourse” that “follows and nuances Foucault’s conception of genealogy, which is largely about uncovering subjugated, disqualified knowledge”.

Race-Ability 
In her works Ben-Moshe examines the intersectional relationship between race, disability, and the prison industrial complex. She connects the work of prison abolitionists to, “begin understanding the ways in which criminalizing entails the construction of both race (especially blackness) and disability (especially mental difference) as dangerous”. Ben-Moshe coins this frame of analyzing “race-ability”.

Other articles and publications 
Rodriguez, S. M., Liat Ben-Moshe, and H. Rakes (2020) Carceral protectionism and the perpetually (in)vulnerable. Criminology & Criminal Justice (online First)

Ben-Moshe, L. (2018) Dis-Epistemologies of Abolition. Critical Criminology, 26(3), 341–355.

Ben-Moshe, L. (2018). "Dis-orientation, dis-epistemology and abolition." Feminist Philosophy Quarterly 4, (2).

Ben-Moshe, L. (2017) Why prisons are not the new asylums. Punishment and Society 19 (3), pp. 272 - 289.

Ben-Moshe, L. (October 2018) Weaponizing Disability. Periscope: Social Text Online (part of the forum “Jasbir Puar: From Terrorist Assemblages to The Right to Maim”).

Ben-Moshe, L. (2018) The State of (intersectional analysis of) State Violence. Women's Studies Quarterly, 46(3), 306–311.

Deinstitutionalization: A case study in carceral abolition. SCAPEGOAT: Architecture | Landscape | Political Economy. Vol 7 (Fall/Winter) 2014, 13-27

Ben-Moshe, L. (2013). Disabling Incarceration: Connecting Disability to Divergent Confinements in the USA. Critical Sociology 37 (7), 385–403.

Ben-Moshe, L. (2011). The Contested meaning of “Community” in Discourses of Deinstitutionalization and Community Living in the Field of Developmental Disability. Research in Social Science and Disability Vol. 6, Special issue on Disability and Community, 241–264.

Ben-Moshe, Liat and Powell, Justin J.W.(2007) 'Sign of our times? Revis(it)ing the International Symbol of Access', Disability & Society, 22: 5, 489 — 505

Ben-Moshe, L. (Spring 2006). Infusing Disability in the Curriculum: The Case of Saramago's Blindness. Disability Studies Quarterly, 26 (2).

References

Year of birth missing (living people)
Living people
Syracuse University College of Law alumni
University of Illinois Chicago faculty